Kharagpur Sadar Assembly constituency is an assembly constituency in Paschim Medinipur district in the Indian state of West Bengal.

Overview
As per orders of the Delimitation Commission, No. 224 Kharagpur Sadar Assembly constituency is composed of the following: Kharagpur municipality and Kharagpur Railway Settlement of Kharagpur I community development block.

Kharagpur Sadar Assembly constituency is part of No. 34 Medinipur (Lok Sabha constituency).

Members of Legislative Assembly
 1957 : Narayan Choubey of CPI 
 1967 : Narayan Choubey (CPI)  
 1969 : Gyan Singh Sohanpal of Congress  
 1972 : Gyan Singh Sohanpal (Congress)   
 1977 : Sudhir Das Sharma, defeated Gyan Singh Sohanpal (Congress)   
 1982 : Gyan Singh Sohanpal (Congress)   
 2001 : Gyan Singh Sohanpal (Congress)   
 2006 : Gyan Singh Sohanpal (Congress)
 2011 : Gyan Singh Sohanpal (Congress)    
 2016 : Dilip Ghosh (BJP), defeated Gyan Singh Sohanpal (Congress)   
 Dilip Ghosh was elected to Lok Sabha in 2019 and vacated this Vidhan Sabha seat.
 ^2019^ : Pradip Sarkar (AITC), in a bye-poll
 2021 : Hiran (BJP)

Election results

2021

2019 Bypoll
A bye- poll was necessitated due to the election of the incumbent MLA, Dilip Ghosh, to the Lok Sabha.

2016 Vidhan Sabha

2011

  

.# CPI(M) did not contest this seat in 2006.

1977-2006
Gyan Singh Sohanpal of Congress won the Kharagpur Town assembly seat for six times in a row from 1982 to 2006 (for earlier victories see below), defeating Prem Chandra Jha of RJD in 2006, Lalji Pandey of CPI(M) in 2001, Kalidas Nayek of CPI(M) in 1996 and 1991, and Jatindra Mitra of CPI(M) in 1987 and 1982. Contests in most years were multi cornered but only winners and runners are being mentioned. Sudhir Das Sharma of Janata Party defeated Jatindra Mitra of CPI(M) in 1977.

1951-1972
Gyan Singh Sohanpal of Congress won in 1972, 1971 and 1969. Narayan Choubey of CPI won in 1967, 1962 and 1957. In independent India's first election in 1951, Kharagpur had a single seat, which was won by Muhammad Momtaz Moulana of Congress.

References

Assembly constituencies of West Bengal
Politics of Paschim Medinipur district
Kharagpur